The Cayman Islands are a British dependency and island country. It is a three-island archipelago in the Caribbean Sea, consisting of Grand Cayman, Cayman Brac, and Little Cayman. Georgetown's geographic coordinates are 19.300° north, 81.383° west.

The Cayman Islands have a land area of  approximately 1.5 times the size of Washington, D.C. and just  larger than Saint Kitts and Nevis.

Geology

The islands are located on the Cayman Rise which forms the northern margin of the Cayman Trough. The trough is the deepest point in the Caribbean Sea and forms part of the tectonic boundary between the North American Plate and the Caribbean Plate. The Cayman Rise extends from southeastern Cuba along the northern margin of the Cayman Trough toward Costa Rica and resulted from Paleocene to Eocene island arc formation with associated volcanism along an extinct subduction zone. The islands are formed of marine limestone and dolomite that was uplifted during the late Miocene epoch. Due to the Islands' location, the Cayman Islands do get earthquakes.

Climate 
The Cayman Islands have a tropical wet and dry climate, with a wet season from May to December, and a dry season that runs from January to April. Terrain is mostly a low-lying limestone base surrounded by coral reefs.

Besides earthquakes another major natural hazard is the tropical cyclones that form during the Atlantic hurricane season from June to November.

Environmental issues 
An important environmental issue is the lack of fresh water resources. Drinking water supplies must be met by rainwater catchment and desalination. There is also a problem with trash washing up on the beaches or being deposited by there by residents. The Cayman Islands have no recycling or waste treatment facilities.

Natural resources 

Natural resources include fish and a climate and beaches that foster tourism, which is the islands' major industry. A 2012 estimate of land use determined that the Cayman Islands' had 0.83 percent arable land and 2.08 percent permanent crops.

Districts 
The territory is subdivided into six districts that are governed by district managers and that have a role as electoral districts and as regional units for statistics. Five of the districts are located on the main island, Grand Cayman. The sixth, Sister Islands, comprises the islands of Little Cayman and Cayman Brac.

The population is concentrated in the three (south-)western districts George Town (capital), West Bay, and Bodden Town. Those have a population density many times higher than all remaining districts.

Extreme points
Northernmost point – Booby Point, Cayman Brac
Easternmost point – North East Point, Cayman Brac
Southernmost point – Great Pedro Point, Grand Cayman
Westernmost point – North West Point, Grand Cayman
Lowest point – Caribbean Sea (0m)
Highest point – 1 km SW of The Bluff, Cayman Brac (50m)

References

External links 

Districts of Cayman Islands, Statoids.com
Cayman vents are world's hottest (BBC News, 10 January 2012)
Cayman Islands Land